The 1985 Campeonato Brasileiro Série B, officially, the Taça de Prata, was the 8th edition of the Campeonato Brasileiro Série B. The championship was disputed by 24 clubs in a knockout tournament form, until the last phase, disputed by a group of three teams. the champion would be promoted to the 1986 Copa Brasil. Tuna Luso won the title, beating Goytacaz and Figueirense in the final group.

First phase

|}

Second phase

|}

Third phase

|}

Final triangular

Sources
 1985 Taça de Prata at RSSSF

Campeonato Brasileiro Série B seasons
B